The women's team archery event at the 2011 Pan American Games was held between October 17–21 at the Pan American Archery Stadium in Guadalajara. The defending Pan American Games champion was Ana María Rendón, Sigrid Romero and Natalia Sánchez of Colombia.

Schedule
All times are Central Standard Time (UTC-6).

Results

Qualification
30 competitors from 10 nations competed.

Elimination rounds

References

Archery at the 2011 Pan American Games